Simon Peter Beare (born 2 July 1979) is a New Zealand former cricketer. He played six first-class and six List A matches for Otago between the 2001/02 and 2004/05 seasons.

Beare was born at Hamilton in 1979 and played age-group cricket for Northern Districts sides. He made his senior debut for Otago in a List A match against Central Districts in January 2002 before going on to make his first-class debut the following month against the same side.

In 2005, he signed a contract with Workington Cricket Club in England to coach the side and play in the North Lancashire and Cumbria League first division. Workington won the Higson Cup and finished third in the league in Beare's first season, with an innings of 215 in the Higson cup final. The side won the league title in 2007 and 2008, but due to a change in the rules surrounding the use of player-coaches, Beare was no longer able to play in league matches for the side. He played for Callington Cricket Club in the Cornwall Cricket League between 2009 and 2011 before he was able to return to play for Workington in 2012.

References

External links
 

1979 births
Living people
New Zealand cricketers
Otago cricketers
Cricketers from Hamilton, New Zealand